The 2007 Philippine Basketball Association (PBA) Fiesta Conference or known as the 2007 Talk 'N Text PBA Fiesta Conference for sponsorship reasons, is the second conference of the 2006-07 season of the Philippine Basketball Association (PBA). Teams are allowed to pick an import with a maximum height-limit of 6-feet, 6-inches tall.

The tournament began on March 4 and finished on July 20. The schedule will be shortened due to the league's commitment to the Philippine national basketball team while 12 players selected by national team head coach Chot Reyes will not play for their mother teams.

Red Bull Barako is the defending champions of the tournament.

Talk 'N Text, a product of Philippine Long Distance Telephone Company, was the main sponsor of the tournament. They also sponsored the 2006-07 PBA Philippine Cup that ended a month before the tournament.

List of imports
The following is the list of imports, which had played for their respective teams at least once, with the returning imports in italics. Highlighted are the imports who stayed with their respective teams for the whole conference.

Welcoat was allowed to have two imports. Compton, is an American citizen was born in the Philippines and was a member of the several local teams playing as a local.

Tournament format
Double round eliminations. Worst team would be eliminated.
Sixth- to ninth-best teams figure in the one-game wildcard playoffs.
Sixth seed vs. Ninth seed
Seventh seed vs. Eighth seed
Winners will figure in a playoff to advance to the quarterfinals.
Third- to fifth-best teams, and the winner of the wildcards advance to the best-of-three quarterfinals.
Third seed vs. winner of wildcards.
Fourth seed vs. fifth seed.
The two best teams and the winners of the quarterfinals advance to the best-of-seven semifinals.
First seed vs. winner of the third seed/wildcard winner quarterfinal series
Second seed vs. winner of the fourth seed/fifth seed quarterfinal series
The winners of the semifinals advance to the best-of-seven Finals; the losers figure in a one-game third-place playoff.

Elimination round

Team standings

Fifth seed playoff

Second seed playoff

Bracket

Quarterfinals

(3) Barangay Ginebra vs. (6) San Miguel

(4) Talk 'N Text vs. (5) Air21

Semifinals

(1) Red Bull vs. (4) Talk 'N Text

(2) Alaska vs. (6) San Miguel

Third place playoff

Finals
Prior to Game 1, Sandwich performed "Laban kung Laban," the TV theme song of the PBA.

Game 1

Game 2

Game 3

Game 4

Game 5

Game 6

Game 7

On Game 1, the Phone Pals raced into a twenty-point lead at the first quarter but the Aces chipped in to lead by a point by halftime. The Phone Pals lost steam as the Aces won the first game. The Phone Pals reversed the roles as the Aces themselves lost steam at the ends of Games 2 and 3 for a Phone Pals 2–1 series lead.

With a 1–3 deficit looming, newly crowned MVP Willie Miller stepped up his performance as he tied his conference-high 29 points to lead the Aces into victory on Game 4. Conference Best Player Mark Cardona blew the Phone Pals chances' when he turned the ball over with 4 seconds with a 2-point deficit to lead a Rosell Ellis tip-in from a Sonny Thoss missed lay-up.

On Game 5, Willie Miller turned cold when the Phone Pals started pulling away. The Piltel franchise notched win #3 to assure a twice-to-beat advantage. Miller, who was severely criticized by a lackluster performance by the MVP, answered his critics with a 37-point output (the best in the Finals by a local) to lead the Aces to a Game 6 win and to force a Game 7.

References

External links
 PBA.ph

Fiesta Conference
PBA Fiesta Conference